Conway is a locality in the Whitsunday Region, Queensland, Australia.

Geography
Conway is bounded on the north-west by Serpentine Creek and to the west and south-west by the Proserpine River. Conway Road runs along the western part of the locality which is lower flatter land; the residential and farming land is in that area. The eastern part of the locality is more mountainous and undeveloped.

History 
The locality name derives from Cape Conway, which was named on 3 June 1770 by Lieutenant James Cook on the HM Bark Endeavour after Henry Seymour Conway, the Secretary of State for the Southern Department from 1765 to 1766 and Northern Department from 1766 to 1768.

References 

Whitsunday Region
Localities in Queensland